The Cashew of Pirangi (Cajueiro de Pirangi), also called the world's largest cashew tree (maior cajueiro do mundo), is a cashew tree in Pirangi do Norte, Rio Grande do Norte, Brazil. In 1994, the tree entered the Guinness Book of Records. The vicinity of the World's Largest Cashew Tree in North Pirangi is also a main place for the sale of lace and embroidery in Rio Grande do Norte state.

The spread over a hectare of land was, unlike other trees, created by the tree's outward growth. When bent towards the ground (because of their weight), the branches tend to take new roots where they touch the ground. This may be seen in the images of the interior. It is now difficult to distinguish the initial trunk from the rest of the tree.

The tree is said to have been planted in 1888. However, based on its growth characteristics, "the tree is estimated to be more than a thousand years old." The tree produces over 60,000 fruits each year.

That tree was studied by a laboratory from the State University of Piauí.

See also
 List of individual trees

References

External links

Cashews
Flora of Rio Grande do Norte
Individual trees in Brazil
Environment of Rio Grande do Norte
Tourist attractions in Rio Grande do Norte